Cybaeus intermedius is a spider species found in Switzerland and Italy.

External links 

Cybaeidae
Spiders described in 1992
Spiders of Europe